Jimmy Mann (born 19 July 1978, in Carshalton) is a retired English professional darts player who played in the Professional Darts Corporation events. He was not a full-time professional and makes his living as a greenkeeper.

Career

Mann made a good showing in the 2005 UK Open Regionals, reaching the semi-finals of the North West Regional and winning the Midlands Regional. He entered the 2005 UK Open as the number 4 seed as a result of his Midlands win, meaning he started his campaign at the Last 64 stage. However, he lost his first match to Mark Landers.

He qualified for the 2006 PDC World Darts Championship but lost in the first round to Terry Jenkins. It remains his only appearance in the televised stages of the competition having missed out in the qualifying rounds in 2007 and 2008.

He had a better run at the 2006 UK Open where starting at the second round, he defeated Matt Chapman and Colin Monk to reach the last 32 stage before losing to the eventual winner Raymond van Barneveld.

His world ranking is still outside the top 64 in the PDC making it difficult for him to qualify for the other prestigious tournaments – he's yet to appear on screen at the other PDC majors – the World Matchplay, World Grand Prix or Las Vegas Desert Classic.

World Championship results

PDC

 2006: 1st Round (lost to Terry Jenkins 2–3) (sets)

References
Mann's darts database profile and results

1978 births
English darts players
Living people
Professional Darts Corporation former tour card holders
PDC ranking title winners